Karmacs is a village in Zala County, Hungary.

Location 

Karmacs is located in the east part of Zala County. The nearest town is Hévíz.

External links 
 Street map 

Populated places in Zala County